Al Qasimia University (also called as AQU) is a national university located in Sharjah. It was established by its founder, president and chairman, the ruler of Sharjah Sheikh Dr. Sultan Bin Mohammed Al Qasimi.

References

External links

Official AQU website

 
Education in the United Arab Emirates
Universities and colleges in Sharjah (city)
Sharjah (city)
University City of Sharjah
Establishments in the United Arab Emirates
Universities and colleges in the United Arab Emirates
Women's universities and colleges in the United Arab Emirates